is a retired Japanese female butterfly swimmer. She represented her native country at the 1996 Summer Olympics in Atlanta, Georgia. She is a former world record holder in the women's 100m (short course) butterfly event.

References
 

1982 births
Living people
Japanese female butterfly swimmers
Japanese women journalists
Olympic swimmers of Japan
Swimmers at the 1996 Summer Olympics
Sportspeople from Ishikawa Prefecture
World record setters in swimming
World Aquatics Championships medalists in swimming
Medalists at the FINA World Swimming Championships (25 m)
Asian Games medalists in swimming
Asian Games gold medalists for Japan
Asian Games silver medalists for Japan
Medalists at the 1998 Asian Games
Swimmers at the 1998 Asian Games
21st-century Japanese women